Biesland is a neighbourhood of Maastricht, Netherlands located in the southwest of the city. It is mainly a residential neighbourhood and relatively affluent.

Notable features

 The former convent (built 1909) of the Brothers of Maastricht, a Roman Catholic Congregation, now housing 257 student residences
 The former tobacco factory Philips (built 1918), currently housing some retail facilities
 Jekerpark, a park along the Jeker river which functions as Biesland's northeastern border
 Waldeckpark, includes remnants of Maastricht's ancient fortifications

Impressions

References

Neighbourhoods of Maastricht